A by-election was held in the Vavaʻu 16 constituency in Tonga on 14 July 2016. It followed the conviction and unseating of MP ‘Etuate Lavulavu for bribery and campaign overspending, in January.

There were four candidates: ‘Akosita Lavulavu (wife of the unseated MP), Viliami Latu (who held the seat as an independent from 2010 to 2014), ‘Atalasa Pouvalu, and ‘Ipeni Siale. The election was won by ‘Etuate Lavulavu's wife ‘Akosita Lavulavu, who thereby became the only female member in Parliament.

Result
The results were as follows:

2014 result
The result in Vavaʻu 16 in the 2014 general election had been as follows:

References

2016 elections in Oceania
2016 in Tonga
By-elections to the Legislative Assembly of Tonga
Politics of Tonga
Vavaʻu